Grégoire Amiot (born 10 May 1995) is a French professional footballer who plays as a centre-back for  club Le Puy.

Honours 
Le Puy

 Championnat National 2: 2021–22

References

External links
 
 

Living people
1995 births
Association football defenders
French footballers
French expatriate footballers
Toulouse FC players
Stade de Reims players
Football Bourg-en-Bresse Péronnas 01 players
Fortuna Sittard players
Falkenbergs FF players
Le Puy Foot 43 Auvergne players
Ligue 2 players
Championnat National players
Eredivisie players
Allsvenskan players
Championnat National 2 players
French expatriate sportspeople in the Netherlands
Expatriate footballers in the Netherlands
French expatriate sportspeople in Sweden
Expatriate footballers in Sweden